In mathematics, a Pontryagin cohomology operation is a cohomology operation taking cohomology classes in H2n(X,Z/prZ) to H2pn(X,Z/pr+1Z) for some prime number p.

See also
Steenrod operation

References

Algebraic topology